The 2005 Brown Bears football team was an American football team that represented Brown University during the 2005 NCAA Division I-AA football season. Brown won the Ivy League championship. 

In their eighth season under head coach Phil Estes, the Bears compiled a 9–1 record and outscored opponents 368 to 218. James Frazier, Jamie Gasparella and Nick Hartigan were the team captains. Hartigan received the Ivy League Bushnell Cup in 2005.

The Bears' 6–1 conference record topped the Ivy League standings. They outscored Ivy opponents 252 to 166. 

Brown was unranked to start the year, and did not enter the national top 25 until November. After closing out the year on an eight-game win streak, the Bears were ranked No. 15 in the final poll.

Brown played its home games at Brown Stadium in Providence, Rhode Island.

Schedule

References

Brown
Brown Bears football seasons
Ivy League football champion seasons
Brown Bears football